Carrickshock is a hamlet in County Kilkenny which gives its name to:
 Carrickshock Commons, a nearby townland
 Carrickshock GAA, local hurling club
 Carrickshock incident, affray on 14 December 1831 in which 17 people were killed